John Breuilly (born October 31, 1946) is professor of nationalism and ethnicity at the London School of Economics. Breuilly is the author of the pioneering Nationalism and the State (1982).

Career
Breuilly taught at the universities of Manchester (1972–95) and Birmingham (1995–2004). He has been a visiting professor at the universities of Hamburg (1987-8) and Bielefeld (1992-3). He is currently professor of nationalism and ethnicity at the London School of Economics.

Research and writing
Breuilly's research interests are "Nationalism and Ethnicity, Modern German History, Comparative European History with special interests in Labour Movements and the Bourgeoisie, Urban Cultural History in 19th Century Europe, Modern Liberalism". At the University of Manchester, Breuilly still regarded himself primarily as a historian of Germany when he became interested in nationalisms. He realised that the only way the book he was looking for on the subject would exist, was if he wrote it. His pioneering Nationalism and the State was published in 1982. Breuilly was also the editor of the Oxford handbook of the history of nationalism (2013).

Selected publications
Nationalism and the State. Manchester: Manchester University Press, 1982. 
The Formation of the First German Nation-State. London: Palgrave Macmillan, 1996. (Studies in European History) 
Austria, Prussia and Germany, 1806–1871. London: Longman, 2002. (Seminar Studies in History) 
Germany's Two Unifications: Anticipations, Experiences, Responses. London: Palgrave, 2004 (edited with Ronald Speirs. 
La formazione dello stato nazionale tedesco (1800–1871). Bologna: Il Mulino, 2004. 
"Nationalism" in: Dowding, Keith, (ed.) Encyclopedia of Power. London: SAGE Publications, 2011. 
The Oxford Handbook of the History of Nationalism. Oxford: Oxford University Press, 2013 (editor) 
Nineteenth-Century Germany: Politics, Culture, and Society 1780–1918. (2020) Second edition.

References

External links
www.nationalismproject.org
Discussion of the Oxford Handbook of the History of Nationalism on YouTube

1946 births
Living people
British historians
Academics of the University of Birmingham
Academics of the Victoria University of Manchester
Academics of the London School of Economics
Alumni of the University of York
Historians of Germany
Scholars of nationalism